Patricia Jean Rosier (21 January 1942 – 12 June 2014) was a New Zealand writer, editor and feminist activist. Born and educated in Auckland into a working-class family, after marriage and raising two children she came out as a lesbian in the 1980s and went on to play a leading role in the second wave of New Zealand's Women's Movement, including editing Broadsheet for six years. In her later years she lived with Prue Hyman in Paekākāriki, north of Wellington.

Non-fiction 
 Broadsheet Editor (1986 to 1992)
 Broadsheet, twenty years of Broadsheet Magazine selected and introduced by Pat Rosier. 1992. New Women's Press, Auckland, NZ.  
 Get used to it!: children of gay and lesbian parents Pat Rosier and Myra Hauschild, Canterbury University Press, 1999.  
 Women's studies: conference papers 1982 Hilary Lapsley, Pat Rosier, Claire-Louise McCurdy and Candis Craven, 1982.
 The 14th Conference of the Women's Studies Association (N.Z.) : "Raranga wahine" Editing by Pat Rosier. 1988.
 Workwise: a guide to managing workplace relationships Pat Rosier, Canterbury University Press, 2001. 
 No body's perfect: a self-help book for women who have problems with food Jasbindar Singh and Pat Rosier New Women's Press, 1989.  
 No body's perfect: dealing with food problems Jasbindar Singh and Pat Rosier, Attic Press, 1990. 
 Lesbians in front, up front, out front Pat Rosier, book chapter in Heading nowhere in a navy blue suit: and other tales from the feminist revolution Susan Jane Kedgley and Mary Varnham Daphne Brasell Associates Press, 1993. 
 Women's studies tutor kit Candis Crave, Margot Roth, Claire-Louise McCurdy and Pat Rosier, Auckland Workers' Educational Association, Women's Studies Sub-Committee, 1983.
 Women and Education Pat Rosier chapter in Perspectives on women today : lecture series, Term I, 1986.

Fiction
 Poppy's return Pat Rosier, Spinifex, 2004 
 Poppy's progress Pat Rosier, Spinifex, 2002 
 Stones gathered together : a collection of stories and thoughts  Pat Rosier, Smashwords, 2012. 
 Take it easy Pat Rosier, Smashwords, 2008. 
 Where the heArt is Pat Rosier, Smashwords, 2013.

References

External links
 blog 
 previous blog
 twitter
 Book Council profile
  Obituary by Prue Hyman
 Obituary by The Standard
  Obituary on The Hand Mirror
 Obituary on GayNZ.com
 '' Obituary on Wellington City Council blog.

1942 births
2014 deaths
New Zealand LGBT novelists
21st-century New Zealand novelists
University of Auckland alumni
New Zealand editors
New Zealand magazine editors
New Zealand feminists
People from Paekākāriki
20th-century New Zealand novelists